Horizon is a 2018 Georgian drama film directed by Tinatin Kajrishvili. It was screened in the Panorama section at the 68th Berlin International Film Festival.

Cast
 Giorgi Bochorishvili as Giorgi
 Ia Sukhitashvili as Ana
 Jano Izoria as Jano
 Ioseb Gogichaishvili as Valiko
 Lili Okroshidze as Marika

References

External links
 

2018 films
2018 drama films
2010s Georgian-language films
Drama films from Georgia (country)